Nundah railway station is located on the North Coast line in Queensland, Australia. It is one of two stations serving the Brisbane suburb of Nundah, the other being Toombul station.

Nundah station opened in 1882 as German station, before being renamed to Nundah within six weeks of opening. The station was rebuilt in 1960. On 29 November 1999, two extra platforms opened as part of the quadruplication of the line from Bowens Hills to Northgate.

Services
Nundah station is served daily by all stops City network services from Shorncliffe to Central, many continuing to Park Road, Cannon Hill, Manly and Cleveland. Also see Inner City timetable

Services by Platform

References

External links

Nundah station Queensland Rail
Nundah station Queensland's Railways on the Internet

Nundah, Queensland
Railway stations in Brisbane
Railway stations in Australia opened in 1882
North Coast railway line, Queensland